Scafell Halt railway station was a station to the west of Newtown, Powys, Wales. The station was adjacent to Scafell Bridge on the River Severn. The station was opened in 1863 and closed in July 1891, before reopening on 9 June 1913. The station closed to passengers in 1952 and closed completely in 1955.

References

Sources

Further reading

Disused railway stations in Powys
Railway stations in Great Britain opened in 1863
Railway stations in Great Britain closed in 1891
Railway stations in Great Britain opened in 1913
Railway stations in Great Britain closed in 1955
Former Cambrian Railway stations